
Gmina Lipsko is an urban-rural gmina (administrative district) in Lipsko County, Masovian Voivodeship, in east-central Poland.

Villages
Apart from the town of Lipsko, Gmina Lipsko contains the villages and settlements of Babilon, Borowo, Boży Dar, Dąbrówka, Daniszów, Długowola Druga, Długowola Pierwsza, Gołębiów, Gruszczyn, Helenów, Huta, Jakubówka, Jelonek, Józefów, Katarzynów, Krępa Górna, Krępa Kościelna, Leopoldów, Leszczyny, Lipa-Krępa, Lipa-Miklas, Lucjanów, Małgorzacin, Maruszów, Maziarze, Nowa Wieś, Poręba, Ratyniec, Śląsko, Szymanów, Tomaszówka, Walentynów, Wiśniówek, Wola Solecka Druga, Wola Solecka Pierwsza, Wólka and Zofiówka.

Neighbouring gminas
Gmina Lipsko is bordered by the gminas of Chotcza, Ciepielów, Rzeczniów, Sienno, Solec nad Wisłą and Tarłów.

References
Polish official population figures 2006

Lipsko
Lipsko County